The 2015–16 DePaul Blue Demons women's basketball team will represent DePaul University during the 2015–16 NCAA Division I women's basketball season. The Blue Demons, led by thirtieth year head coach Doug Bruno, play their home games at the McGrath-Phillips Arena. They were members of the new Big East Conference. They finished the season 27–9, 16–2 in Big East play to win the Big East regular season title. They advanced to the semifinals of the Big East women's tournament where they lost to St. John's. They received an at-large bid to the NCAA women's basketball tournament where they defeated James Madison in the first round, Louisville in the second round before losing to Oregon State in the sweet sixteen.

Previous season
The Blue Devils finished the 2014–15 season 27–8, 15–3 in Big East play to share the regular season title with Seton Hall. They also won the Big East tournament to earn an automatic trip to the 2015 NCAA Division I women's basketball tournament which they lost to Notre Dame in the second round.

Roster

Schedule

|-
!colspan=9 style="background:#00438c; color:#F10041;"| Exhibition

|-
!colspan=9 style="background:#00438c; color:#F10041;"| Non-conference regular season

|-
!colspan=9 style="background:#00438c; color:#F10041;"| Conference regular season

|-
!colspan=9 style="background:#00438c; color:#F10041;"| Big East Women's Tournament

|-
!colspan=9 style="background:#00438c; color:#F10041;"| NCAA Women's Tournament

Source:

Rankings

References

DePaul
DePaul Blue Demons women's basketball seasons
DePaul
Depaul
Depaul